GraphEdit is a utility which is part of the Microsoft DirectShow SDK. It is a visual tool for building and testing filter graphs for DirectShow. Filters are displayed as boxes, with a text caption showing the name of the filter. Pins appear as small squares along the edge of the filter. Input pins are shown on the left side of the filter, and output pins are on the right side of the filter. A pin connection appears as an arrow connecting the output pin to the input pin. Connection mediatypes can be viewed as "properties" on pins and connections.  GraphEdit can automatically build a filter graph that plays a file.

See also 
 GraphStudio
 DirectShow
 Microsoft Platform SDK

External links 
GraphStudio - an OpenSource GraphEdit implementation (GPL License)
GraphStudioNext - a recent fork of OpenSource GraphStudio with many additional features (GPL License)
Overview of GraphEdit - Microsoft's GraphEdit pages
Download link - Download location from Microsoft's website
GraphEditPlus - Commercial reimplementation of GraphEdit which provides more information and control on filters, mediatypes etc. and has source code generation.
DSGraphEdit - Open Source clone of GraphEdit written in C#.

Graphics software
Microsoft software